AFW may refer to:

 Access Fort Wayne, local produced programming for Fort Wayne, Indiana (see Allen County Public Library)
 Africa World Airlines, from its ICAO airline code
 American Furniture Warehouse, sometimes shortened to AFW, a chain of furniture stores.
 Fort Worth Alliance Airport, from its IATA airport code
 AFW (motorcycle), a 1920s German bike